Super Pig is a 1976 best-selling comedy book written and illustrated by William Rushton, with a foreword by "W.G. Rushton". In the book, Rushton presents, with humour, a gentleman's guide to everyday survival. The book offers practical tips on such basics as:

 dealing with a hangover
 housework and how to avoid it
 cooking dinner
 cocktails
 how to impress the ladies
 how to bring up small children
 dieting, giving up smoking and drink
 travelling

Super Pig was published by the Queen Anne Press Division of MacDonald and Jane's Ltd, London.

References

Comedy books
Self-help books